The ING Group is a Dutch multinational banking and financial services corporation headquartered in Amsterdam. Its primary businesses are retail banking, direct banking, commercial banking, investment banking, wholesale banking, private banking, asset management, and insurance services. With total assets of US$1.1 trillion, it is one of the biggest banks in the world, and consistently ranks among the top 30 largest banks globally. It is among the top ten largest European companies by revenue.

ING is the Dutch member of the Inter-Alpha Group of Banks, a co-operative consortium of 11 prominent European banks. Since the creation in 2012,  is a member in the list of global systemically important banks.

In 2020, ING had 53.2 million clients in more than 40 countries. The company is a component of the Euro Stoxx 50 stock market index. The long-term debt for the company as of December 2019 is €150 billion.

The orange lion on ING's logo alludes to the group's Dutch origins.

History
ING Group traces its roots to two major insurance companies in the Netherlands and the banking services of the Dutch government. In 1991 the insurance branch of Nationale-Nederlanden and the banking branch of "NMB Postbank Groep" merged. NMB stands for "Nederlandsche Middenstands Bank".

Insurance
In 1845, the fire insurance company Assurantie Maatschappij tegen Brandschade de Nederlanden van 1845 ("Fire Insurance Company of the Netherlands of 1845") was founded. It grew to be the leading Dutch insurance company with branches outside the Netherlands (139 the world over by 1900). It later changed its name to "De Nederlanden van 1845". Two decades later, in 1863, the life insurance company Nationale Levensverzekerings Bank ("National Life Insurance Bank") was founded in Rotterdam. These two insurance companies made multiple acquisitions, and in 1963 merged to form the Nationale-Nederlanden insurance company. Nationale-Nederlanden expanded significantly during the 1970s and 1980s.

Banking
In 1881, the Dutch government created the Rijkspostspaarbank, a postal savings system to encourage workers to start saving. Four decades later they added the Postcheque and Girodienst services allowing working families to make payments via post offices. Separately in 1927, the Dutch government initiated a re-organization of Dutch banks which resulted in the creation of the Nederlandsche Middenstands Bank (NMB). NMB's focus was retail banking in the Netherlands and abroad.

In 1986, post office banking services were privatized as Postbank N.V. and three years later it would merge with NMB bank to form NMB Postbank Groep.

Merger of banking and insurance
In 1991, the banking business of NMB Postbank Groep and the insurance business of Nationale-Nederlanden were merged to create ING Group.

Further acquisitions
Since the ING Group was founded, it has made several acquisitions:

International expansion
ING Group expanded its international business through several acquisitions through the 1990s including Belgian bank Banque Bruxelles Lambert (BBL) in 1998, US-based insurance company Equitable of Iowa and the commercial bank Furman Selz. It also acquired Frankfurt based BHF-Bank in 1999, although disposed of this later. It increased its Latin American and Asia Pacific's insurance businesses with the acquisition of ReliaStar and Aetna's Financial Services unit. It also acquired the Polish Bank Śląski and Mexican insurance company Seguros Comercial América.

The 1995 purchase of Barings Bank after its dramatic failure led to a boost in the company's investment banking business.

Expanding its retail banking business overseas, ING used the direct banking business model it had developed with NMB Postbank to launch direct banking in other countries. The first of these was set up in Canada in 1997, and was soon followed in several other countries including the US, UK, Germany, Spain, Italy, France and Australia.

Capital injection and divestiture
In 2008, as part of the late-2000s financial crisis ING Group, together with many other major banks in the Netherlands, took a capital injection from the Dutch Government. This support increased ING's capital ratio above eight-percent, however as a condition of Dutch state aid, the EU demanded a number of changes to the company structure. This resulted in the sale of a number of businesses around the world, which included insurance businesses in Latin America, Asia, Canada, Australia and New Zealand and ING Direct units in the US, Canada and the UK. This included the sale of the ING Direct US operations to Capital One, ING Direct Canada to Scotiabank (d/b/a/ Tangerine) and the ING Direct UK operations to Barclays bank in 2012. The spun-off insurance businesses in North America were renamed Voya Financial in 2014.

Global operations

ING has offices in: 

Argentina
Australia
Austria
Belgium
Brazil
Bulgaria
China
Colombia
Denmark
Estonia
Finland
France
Germany
Hong Kong
Hungary
India
Indonesia
Ireland
Italy
Japan
Kazakhstan
Latvia
Lithuania
Luxembourg
Malaysia
Mexico
Monaco
Mongolia
Netherlands
Norway
Philippines
Poland
Portugal
Romania
Russia
Singapore
Slovakia
South Korea
Spain
Sweden
Taiwan
Thailand
Turkey
Ukraine
United Kingdom
United States
Vietnam

Global headquarters
Following the separation of ING Group into ING Bank and ING Insurance, the head office of ING Bank and ING Group was the Amsterdamse Poort building.

ING corporate head office is situated in Cumulus Park, Amsterdam's innovation district in the south-east of the city. The five-storey building has a glass facade and is named after the Cedar tree, symbolising sustainability and growth. Its framework, with its layered branches and open spaces in between, is characteristic of a Cedar.

ING House was the head office of NN Group and located in the business district of Zuidas in Amsterdam, Netherlands from 2012 to 2014. It was designed by Roberto Meyer and Jeroen van Schooten and was officially opened on 16 September 2002 by then Prince Willem-Alexander of the Netherlands. The light-infused building features a 250-seat auditorium, foyer, restaurants, library and an extensive art collection.

Recent notable transactions

Capital injection and repayment
In October 2008, in a move to increase its core Tier 1 capital ratio above 8%, ING Group accepted a capital injection plan from the Dutch Government. The plan supplied €10 billion (US$13.5 billion) to the operation, in exchange for securities and veto rights on major operational changes and investments. The European Commission also required ING to divest itself of its insurance and investment management operations by the end of 2013 as a condition of approving the state aid.

In December 2009, ING raised €7.3 billion through share issues, and repurchased securities representing half of the €10 billion in state aid. It repurchased another €2 billion in May 2011 (at a 50% premium), and looked to complete the repayments by May 2012. However, in January 2012 it cited eurozone conditions in putting the repayment timetable as 2012–2013 for the remaining €3 billion. The final tranche of €1.025 billion was paid on 7 November 2014, half a year ahead of the repayment schedule as agreed with the European Commission in 2012.

Latin American divestment
In July 2011, ING sold all its Latin American insurance operations to the Colombian insurance company Grupo Sura for US$3.85 billion, excluding ING's 36 percent holding in Brazilian insurer SulAmérica Seguros, which was sold at a later date. The actions were in line with EU demands to split the Group's banking and insurance operations as a condition of Dutch state aid. In 2013, ING reduced its stake in SulAmérica Seguros by 7.2%.

2012 settlement with US Treasury Department
On 12 June 2012, the US Department of the Treasury's Office of Foreign Assets Control announced a US$619 million settlement with ING Bank N.V. to settle potential liability for conspiring to violate the International Emergency Economic Powers Act (IEEPA) and the Trading with the Enemy Act (TWEA) and for violating New York state laws by illegally moving billions of dollars through the U.S. financial system on behalf of sanctioned Cuban and Iranian entities. ING Bank settled at the same time with OFAC, the US Attorney's Office for the District of Columbia, the New York County District Attorney's Office and the Department of Justice's National Security Division and Justice's Asset Forfeiture and Money Laundering Section.

Under the settlement agreement, ING Bank is required to conduct a review of, and to submit a report to the Treasury Department.

Activities
Beginning in the 1990s, at the instruction of senior bank management, ING Bank employees in Curaçao began processing payments for ING Bank's Cuban banking operations through its branch in Curaçao on behalf of Cuban customers without reference to the payments' origin. The practice of removing and omitting such information was used by other branches of ING Bank's Wholesale Banking Division, including in France, Belgium, and the Netherlands, in processing US dollar payments and trade finance transactions through the United States. In addition, ING Bank's senior management in France authorised, advised in the creation of, and ultimately provided fraudulent endorsement stamps for use by Cuban financial institutions in processing travelers check transactions, which disguised the involvement of Cuban banks in these transactions when they were processed through the US. ING Bank's Trade and Commodity Finance business at its Wholesale Banking branch in the Netherlands routed payments made on behalf of US-sanctioned Cuban clients through other corporate clients to obscure the sanctioned clients' identities and its Romanian branch omitted details from a letter of credit involving a US financial institution to finance the exportation of US-origin goods to Iran.

Other notable activities:
In 2004, ING Groep sold CenE Bankiers, which had previously been part of NMB, to F. Van Lanschot Bankiers.
On 25 March 2005, the company announced the acquisition of a 19.9% stake in the Bank of Beijing and the deal was worth about 1.7 billion yuan, or $200 million.
In January 2013, ING announced it had sold its 26% stake in India's Vysya Life Insurance to joint partner Exide Industries.
In January 2016, ING Groep NV's banking unit invested in a leading Chinese fintech player, WeLab. This contributed to the second largest Series B fundraising in fintech globally.
In March 2018, ING and Credit Suisse completed the first live securities lending transaction worth €25 million using an application from HQLAx, a financial technology firm, that was built on Corda. ING has also invested in several blockchain projects, including Komgo, that aims to automate a variety of transactions using the Ethereum.

ING US IPO and re-brand
In 2013, ING U.S. was spun off in an initial public offering ahead of its planned rebranding as Voya Financial. As of 2014, ING Group is no longer the controlling shareholder of its former subsidiary, owning 47% of its shares. By 2018 ING had sold all of its shares.

Divisions

Retail banking 
Separate to ING Direct businesses, ING offers retail banking services in Australia, Austria, Belgium, Czech Republic, Germany, Poland, Italy, Luxembourg, Netherlands, Romania, Spain, Turkey and Philippines. Non-retail private banking services are offered in Netherlands, Belgium, Luxembourg, Switzerland and various countries in Asia and Central Europe.

In the Netherlands, ING is the largest retail bank by market share, holding 40% of current account deposits,  and by total assets. ING is followed by Rabobank (30%), ABN AMRO (20%), and others (10%).

In Belgium
ING Belgium is the Belgian subsidiary of ING Group. The bank was formerly known as Bank Brussel Lambert (BBL) which became part of ING Group in 1998.  It provides retail and commercial banking services to individuals and businesses in Belgium, together with related financial products such as insurance and asset management. BBL was created in 1975 from the merger of Banque de Bruxelles and Banque Lambert. It made a 2021 profit of €948 million.

Shareholdings in other banks
ING has a 17% stake in the Bank of Beijing, the largest urban commercial bank in China.

In Thailand, ING has a 30% stake in TMB Bank, a universal banking platform with a nationwide network. In 2013 ING announced intent to sell its stake in TMB bank.

In Poland, the group in 1996 became the Silesian Bank's majority shareholder. In 2001 Bank Śląski merged with ING Bank N.V. Branch in Warsaw. Since then, the bank is operating under the name of ING Bank Śląski.

Direct Banking
ING offers branchless banking with operations in Australia, Italy, Spain, Germany and Austria. It offers services over the counter, web, phone, ATM or by mail. The service concentrates on simple interest-bearing savings accounts for retail customers. Originally created as ING Direct, these branches were renamed to ING between 2017 and 2019.

In Australia

ING in Australia was established in 1999 and is headquartered in Sydney, offering banking online and via telephone. Its products in Australia include transaction accounts, savings accounts, credit card, business accounts, term deposits, home loans and superannuation.

Company operations are regulated by the Australian Prudential Regulation Authority and the Australian Securities and Investments Commission, Federal Government regulators. ING is a division of ING Bank (Australia) Limited.

In Germany
ING-DiBa is Germany's third biggest bank by the number of customers (c. 9 million). In 2016, the bank reported total assets of €158 billion and had around 3,900 employees. ING bought 49% of Allgemeine Deutsche Direktbank AG in 1998, which as of 1989 traded as DiBa. It acquired a further 21% of the company in 2002 and the remainder by 2003. By 2007, the company was trading under the name ING-DiBa. In November 2018, the bank changed its name to ING.

In Italy 
Founded in 2001, ING in Italy has around 1.3 million customers. It is currently opening its own "bank shops" in the major towns, where customers can operate services on usual web channels, assisted or not by branch operators, and use advanced teller machines for cash and check transactions.

In Philippines 

Operates exclusively through mobile app. ING has two offices in Taguig, Metro Manila; World Plaza Building and Arthaland Century Pacific Tower. 
Mobile system started in 2019 prior to the pandemic, and offered one of the highest interest rates for the first few months of operations. It was one of the first banks that allowed check deposits via image capture using a mobile phone.

Wholesale Banking

ING Wholesale Banking provides banking and financial services to corporations and other institutions. The primary geographic focus of the wholesale banking business is the Netherlands, Belgium, Poland and Romania, where it offers a range of products, from cash management to corporate finance. Elsewhere, it takes a more selective approach to clients and products.

ING Wholesale Banking was strengthened in 1995, when ING took over Barings Bank. This acquisition increased the brand recognition of ING around the world and strengthened its Wholesale Banking presence in the emerging markets. Following the acquisition and up until 2004, ING's investment banking division was called ING Barings, at which point it severed its ties with the Barings name and combined with ING's other wholesale banking operations. However, the top floor of ING's London office is still home to the famous Baring art collection, and the Baring Foundation, a charitable foundation.

Wholesale Banking is divided into a number of sub-divisions, including Structured Finance, Financial Markets, Transaction Services and Corporate Finance. ING Wholesale Banking is the new name for ING Commercial Banking as of 20 January 2016. The new name better reflects the large corporate and institutional, international offering that makes up the vast majority of ING WB's business.

Corporate finance
ING's Corporate Finance department advises businesses on important corporate transactions, including mergers and acquisitions, initial public offerings, secondary offerings, share buy-backs and management buy-outs. The division is headed jointly by Maurits Duynstee (Head of Corporate Finance, Continental Western Europe) and Pierre Chabrelie (Head of Corporate Finance, UK and CEE).

ING Corporate Finance has a strong presence in Russia and Central and Eastern Europe.

Insurance

ING's insurance business operates throughout America, Asia and Europe.

In 2009, ING announced plans to separate its insurance business from its main banking operations through two IPO's, one for Europe and Asia and another one for the US. The EuroAsia IPO has been delayed while the US IPO is supposed to be completed by the end of 2012. Analysts estimate that the insurance arm is worth up to €16 billion.

As of February 2009, ING Canada (the insurance arm) is no longer a subsidiary of ING Group. ING Group's 70% equity interest was spun off for US$2.2 billion. The company (which has an 11% share of Canada's property and casualty insurance market) was then renamed Intact Financial Corporation in May 2009. ING Group continued to operate ING Bank of Canada, also known as ING Direct Canada.

ING sold its Malaysian insurance business to American International Assurance in October 2012 for a total of €1.3 billion.

ING Australia

ING Insurance Australia was purchased by ANZ in 2009, and rebranded as "OnePath" in 2010. ING Australia remains a subsidiary of ING group.

ING Investment Management
In June 2014, ING announced the IPO of its investment management arm as part of a wider corporate restructuring. The business are to be consolidated in NN Group and subsequently floated. The IPO was priced on 1 July 2015. ING Investment Management was subsequently rebranded as NN Investment Partners.

Former divisions

ING Direct Canada

ING's history in Canada dates back to 1997 when it founded ING Direct Canada, the first ING Direct operation in the world. By July 2011, ING Direct Canada had over 1.7 million clients, employed over 900 people and had over US$37.6 billion in assets. ING Direct Canada operated five 'Save Your Money Cafés' (branches) in the major cities of Toronto, Montréal, Calgary and Vancouver.

Its products included savings accounts, tax-free savings accounts (TFSAs), mortgages, retirement savings plans (RSPs), guaranteed investments (GICs), mutual funds, business accounts and a no-fee daily checking accounts. They were known for using a referral program as part of their advertising, allowing members to refer friends whereby both the referrer and referee receive a cash bonus.

On 29 August 2012, Scotiabank announced the acquisition of ING Direct Canada for C$3.13 billion. The sale was completed on 15 November 2012. In November 2013, Scotiabank announced the rebranding of ING Direct Canada as Tangerine with the rebranding taking effect on 8 April 2014.

ING Direct France 
Founded in 2000, ING in France had around 1 million customers at peak. It started offering current accounts in 2009 and home loans in 2015. Formerly ING Direct, the bank changed its name to ING in January 2019.

In 2022 ING closed its direct banking business in France which was never profitable, and sold its retail customer portfolio (but not the business itself) to Boursorama, a direct banking subsidiary of Société Générale.

ING kept its wholesale and investment banking business in France.

ING Direct United Kingdom

ING Direct began operations in the UK in May 2003 and had over one million customers by 2009. Operations were based in Reading, where the company head office was situated as well as an office based in Cardiff. The bank picked up awards for its customer services and mortgage product in 2008 and 2009.

On 8 October 2008, ING purchased the savings accounts of collapsed Icelandic bank, Kaupthing Singer & Friedlander, the UK Treasury used the Banking (Special Provisions) Act 2008 to transfer the Kaupthing Edge deposit business to ING Direct. Through this, ING Direct took over responsibility for £2.5 billion of deposits of 160,000 UK customers with the Icelandic bank Kaupthing Edge.

ING Direct products in the UK included savings accounts, Cash ISAs, mortgages and home insurance.

ING announced a plan to exit the UK in August 2012, as it sought to raise funds to repay the Dutch government. On 9 October 2012 Barclays announced that it had agreed to buy ING Direct UK, taking on its £10.9bn deposits and £5.6bn mortgage book. ING said it would incur a €320m (£260m; $415m) after-tax loss on the sale, which would involve the transfer of 750 ING Direct staff and 1.5 million customers.

ING Direct United States
In 2000, ING launched a direct bank in the United States, with headquarters in Wilmington, Delaware.

In September 2007, ING Direct acquired 104,000 customers and FDIC insured assets from NetBank after it suffered from bank failure. Two months later, ING Direct acquired Sharebuilder, an electronic trading platform.

In February 2012, Capital One acquired ING Direct USA from ING for US$6.3 billion in cash and 54 million shares of Capital One. ING sold the Capital One shares later that year. Between November 2012 and February 2013 ING Direct's U.S. operations were rebranded Capital One 360.

Sponsorships

ING sponsors sporting events and artistic exhibitions throughout the world.

Sporting
For several years, ING was the title sponsor of marathons including the New York City Marathon, the Miami Marathon, the Georgia Marathon, the Luxembourg Marathon, the Hartford Marathon, the Philadelphia Distance Run and San Francisco's Bay to Breakers.

ING is a major global sponsor of association football, sponsoring the Royal Dutch Football Association, Royal Belgian Football Association and the Asian Football Confederation (AFC).

ING was the title sponsor of the Renault Formula One team from the 2007 season to the 2009 season. It was the title sponsor of the Australian Grand Prix and Belgian Grand Prix, the Hungarian Grand Prix, and the Turkish Grand Prix. ING ended its sponsorship of Renault in part due to a reduction in advertising spending and in part due to controversy surrounding the Renault Formula One team.

It also sponsored the ING Cup cricket competition in Australia between 2001 and 2006, a domestic limited overs competition.

Arts
ING's sponsorships in the arts include the Dutch National Museum in Amsterdam (the Rijksmuseum), the New York Museum of Modern Art, and the Royal Concertgebouw Orchestra. ING owns and houses proprietary art collections in Belgium, Mexico, the Netherlands, Poland and the United Kingdom.

ING has sponsored the Amsterdam Gay Pride since 2008.

Education
ING is a strategic industry partner with Duisenberg school of finance. ING provides a series of internships and assists with student loans to the accepted students. Also, in-house events are organised for Duisenberg school of finance students to give better insight on the financial industry.

ING Unsung Heroes is a grant program for kindergarten through 12th grade educators in the United States. The program is run by the U.S. Financial Services division of global financial services company ING Group (ING).

Money laundering case
In September 2018, ING agreed to pay €775 million to end a money laundering probe.

In September 2020, FinCEN Files disclosed that ING bank in Poland helped its Russian and Ukrainian tycoons to launder huge amounts of money out of Russia.

See also

European Financial Services Roundtable
Inter-Alpha Group of Banks

Notes

References

External links
   
 
 

 
Companies listed on Euronext Amsterdam
Banks of the Netherlands
Systemically important financial institutions
Multinational companies headquartered in the Netherlands
Insurance companies of the Netherlands
Banks established in 1991
Financial services companies established in 1991
Dutch brands
Companies based in Amsterdam
Investment management companies of the Netherlands
1991 establishments in the Netherlands
Companies in the Euro Stoxx 50